SAVVY Vodka is a super-premium vodka produced by Savvy Distillers, LP. Founded by Chad Auler, SAVVY Vodka was established in 2006. This private company is incorporated and based in Austin, Texas. They specialize in "handcrafted" vodka produced in a micro-distillery also located in Austin, TX. Their products however are only available in the state of Texas.

Founder
Charles Edwin (Chad) Auler has been involved in the alcoholic beverage industry for over 15 years.  During his ongoing career he has done work in affiliation with Fall Creek Vineyards where he is vice-president, as well as Perfect 10 Wines. Fall Creek Vineyards was founded by Chad Auler's father Ed Auler, who is also the president and winemaker of the company.

Process
The vodka is distilled from grain grown in Texas, and the quantity produced is limited to only 400 gallons at a time. This is also the basis on which they refer to their product as "handcrafted" due to the reasonably smaller batches produced. They use a 20-foot column still in which their spirits are distilled at least 20 times per batch. This is compared to a traditional pot still which some consider producing a less clean or less pure product.  The column still used also allows them to produce their product more efficiently at a fraction of the energy typically used in similar processes.  It is estimated to be 200% more efficient than a traditional pot still.  In addition to its low energy use, the water used in the distillation is recycled between a custom two-tank water reclamation system. This allows them to reuse the 3,000 gallons of water for multiple batches instead of wasting more with each distillation process. The water used is that of a private family-owned spring-fed creek that flows through the Fall Creek Ranch. The Auler family owns the ranch and has rights to the aquifer that generates the water within the stream.

References

Alcoholic drink brands
American vodkas
American brands